Morris On is a folk/rock album released in 1972 under the joint names of Ashley Hutchings, Richard Thompson, Dave Mattacks, John Kirkpatrick and Barry Dransfield. Like the subsequent "Descendant Of" Morris On albums (see below), it features English Morris dance tunes and songs, played with a combination of traditional instruments (button accordion, concertina, fiddle, etc.) and modern ones (electric guitar, bass, drums). In common with later records, dancers complete with bells and sticks were also included in the sessions.

A digitally remastered version of the album was released on 18 January 2010.

The album is described by Allmusic's reviewer as 

The cover includes an amusing photograph of the principal participants in morris-associated costume, but with modern accessories - Hutchings' morris man sports a Gibson Flying V guitar, Kirkpatrick's chimney sweep a vacuum cleaner, Dave Mattacks on a Raleigh chopper bicycle and hobby horse, Barry Dransfield dressed as a woman with a balloon instead of a pig's bladder and the odd one out, Richard Thompson, dressed in Lincoln Green holding a crossbow. This cover is in keeping with the jollity of the music, including as it does nonsense songs, exuberant dance, general bawdiness and the grand false start to Princess Royal. Later "Descendant Of" Morris On album covers followed this template.

The album was produced and engineered by John Wood.

Track listing 
(All tracks trad. arr. Dransfield/Mattacks/Kirkpatrick/Hutchings/Thompson)
 "Morris Call"
 "Greensleeves"
 "The Nutting Girl"
 "Old Woman Tossed Up In A Blanket(Roud 1297) / Shepherds' Hey / Trunkles"
 "Staines Morris"
 "Lads A'Bunchum / Young Collins"
 "Vandals Of Hammerwich"
 "Willow Tree / Bean Setting / Shooting"
 "I'll Go And 'List For A Sailor"
 "Princess Royal"
 "Cuckoo's Nest"
 "Morris Off"

Personnel 
 John Kirkpatrick - Vocals, Button Accordion, anglo-concertina, harmonium, tambourine
 Richard Thompson - Vocals, electric guitar
 Barry Dransfield - Vocals, fiddle, acoustic guitar
 Ashley Hutchings - Vocals, bass guitar
 Dave Mattacks - Drums, tambourine
with
 Shirley Collins, listed as Shirley Hutchings on the original album - vocals on "The Willow Tree" and "Staines Morris"
 Bert Cleaver - Pipe and tabor on "Vandals Of Hammerwich"
 Ray Worman - Dances the Bacca Pipes Jig to "Greensleeves"
 Chingford Morris Men - Stick dances on "Lads A'Bunchum" and "Young Collins"

Subsequent "Descendant Of" Morris On albums 
(all produced by Ashley Hutchings)
 Son of Morris On (1976)
 Grandson of Morris On (2002)
 Great Grandson of Morris On (2004)
 Morris On The Road (2005)
 The Mother of all Morris (2007)

References 

1972 albums
Albums produced by John Wood (record producer)
Morris On albums
Island Records albums